The Noxen School, also known as Noxen High School, is a historic school building located in Noxen Township, Wyoming County, Pennsylvania. The original section was built in 1897, and is a -story, T-shaped frame building.  It has a two classroom addition built in 1922.  Originally built as a grade school, it was used as the high school from 1902 to 1951. It then housed an elementary school until closed in 1976.  It has since been used for a variety of commercial and institutional purposes.

It was added to the National Register of Historic Places in 2006.

References

Education in Wyoming County, Pennsylvania
School buildings on the National Register of Historic Places in Pennsylvania
School buildings completed in 1922
Buildings and structures in Wyoming County, Pennsylvania
National Register of Historic Places in Wyoming County, Pennsylvania
1922 establishments in Pennsylvania